Sachin Premashan Dias Angodavidanalage (born 18 July 1996) is a Sri Lankan badminton player. He won two silver medals and a bronze in singles and doubles at the South Asian Games. He studied at the St. Sebastian's College, Moratuwa

Career 
In his junior stage, Dias participated the 2014 Youth Olympic Games in Nanjing, China. He won a bronze medal in the mixed doubles discipline partnered with He Bingjiao.

He later transitioned from singles to doubles. He partnered with Buwaneka Goonethilleka and won a bronze medal at the 2016 South Asian Games. They reached the semifinals in the 2018 Commonwealth Games but lost the bronze medal match to Goh V Shem and Tan Wee Kiong. They also won silver in the 2019 edition of the Games in Kathmandu.

In 2021, he won two titles at the Bangladesh International, with Goonethilleka in men's doubles and Kavidi Sirimannage in mixed doubles.

In 2022, he and his partner, Thilini Hendahewa won Sri Lanka's first ever BWF World Tour title at the 2022 Odisha Open in the mixed doubles discipline. He later represented the Sri Lankan team at the 2022 Commonwealth Games.

Achievements

Youth Olympic Games 
Mixed doubles

South Asian Games 
Men's singles

Men's doubles

Mixed doubles

BWF World Tour (1 title) 
The BWF World Tour, which was announced on 19 March 2017 and implemented in 2018, is a series of elite badminton tournaments sanctioned by the Badminton World Federation (BWF). The BWF World Tours are divided into levels of World Tour Finals, Super 1000, Super 750, Super 500, Super 300 (part of the HSBC World Tour), and the BWF Tour Super 100.

Mixed doubles

BWF International Challenge/Series (2 titles) 
Men's doubles

Mixed doubles

  BWF International Challenge tournament
  BWF International Series tournament

References

External links 
 
 

Living people
1996 births
People from Sri Jayawardenepura Kotte
Sri Lankan male badminton players
Badminton players at the 2014 Summer Youth Olympics
Badminton players at the 2018 Commonwealth Games
Badminton players at the 2022 Commonwealth Games
Commonwealth Games competitors for Sri Lanka
Badminton players at the 2018 Asian Games
Asian Games competitors for Sri Lanka
South Asian Games silver medalists for Sri Lanka
South Asian Games bronze medalists for Sri Lanka
South Asian Games medalists in badminton